Santiago Alfonso Pichardo Lechuga (born February 1, 1973 in Mexico City) is a co-founder and current lead singer of Mexican electronic group Mœnia. Pichardo served as Mœnia's vocalist in their early years but was replaced by Juan Carlos Lozano in 1993, and in 1998 he came back to record the group's second album, Adición.

His father is the politician Ignacio Pichardo. Alfonso Pichardo was once married to Mexican model, Victoria Gonzalez.

Alfonso has also started a solo project and released an EP album entitled Equivocal with the song "Dar la Vuelta".

References 

1973 births
Living people
Mexican electronic musicians
21st-century Mexican singers
21st-century Mexican male singers